George Douglas Sapsford (10 March 1896 – 17 October 1970) was an English footballer. His regular position was as a forward. He was born in Higher Broughton, Salford, Lancashire. He played for Clarendon, Manchester United, Preston North End and Southport.

External links
MUFCInfo.com profile

1896 births
People from Broughton, Greater Manchester
1970 deaths
English footballers
Manchester United F.C. players
Preston North End F.C. players
Southport F.C. players
Association football forwards